Ernest George Record  (10 May 1899 – 25 September 1956) was an Australian politician.

He was born in Strood, Kent, England. An accountant before entering politics, he was elected to the Tasmanian Legislative Council in 1948 as the independent member for Cornwall. He served until his retirement in 1954. Record died in 1956 in Launceston.

References

1899 births
1956 deaths
Independent members of the Parliament of Tasmania
Members of the Tasmanian Legislative Council
Officers of the Order of the British Empire
English emigrants to Australia
People from Strood
20th-century Australian politicians